Survey Isthmus is a narrow isthmus about 39 m high separating Elsehul and Undine Harbor near the west end of South Georgia. The name appears to first have been used on a 1931 British Admiralty chart.

Landforms of South Georgia